Statistics of Danish War Tournament in the 1942/1943 season.

Series 1

Series 2

Series 3

Quarterfinals
Hobro IK 0-4 Kjøbenhavns Boldklub
Esbjerg fB 3-2 Køge BK
KFUM 0-1 Akademisk Boldklub
Aarhus Gymnastikforening 1-1 Boldklubben Frem
Aarhus Gymnastikforening was awarded winner by lot.

Semifinals
Kjøbenhavns Boldklub 2-0 Aarhus Gymnastikforening
Akademisk Boldklub 6-1 Esbjerg fB

Final
Kjøbenhavns Boldklub 1-2 Akademisk Boldklub

References
Denmark - List of final tables (RSSSF)

Top level Danish football league seasons
Den
Football